PSNC may refer to
Preservation Society of Newport County
Pacific Steam Navigation Company
Puget Sound Navigation Company
Pharmaceutical Services Negotiating Committee
PSNC Energy